is a Japanese futsal player. Japanese national futsal team.

Club 
 2007-2016 Nagoya Oceans

Titles 
 F.League (9)
 2007–08, 2008–09, 2009–10, 2010–11, 2011–12, 2012–13, 2013–14, 2014–15, 2015–16
 All Japan Futsal Championship (4)
 2007, 2013, 2014, 2015
 F.League Ocean Cup (5)
 2010, 2011, 2012, 2013, 2014
 AFC Futsal Club Championship (3)
 2011, 2014, 2016

References

External links 
FIFA profile

1982 births
Living people
Japanese men's futsal players
Nagoya Oceans players
People from Tokyo